Pray is the fifth studio album by Japanese Pop band Deen. It was released on 20 November 2002 under Berg label records. The album consists of only one previously released single, Birthday eve ~Dare yori mo Hayai Ai no Uta~ and its coupling song. Bonus track "Christmas Time" appeared only in limited first-press release, this song was originally released in conceptual single "Classics One: White Christmas time".

Since this album only three original members (without Naoki) continued their music activities.

The album reached #12 in its first week and charted for 4 weeks, selling 24,377 copies.

Track listing

In media
Birthday eve ~Dare yori mo Hayai Ai no Uta~ - insert song for Tokyo Broadcasting System Television program Saturday Night Chubaw!

References

Sony Music albums
Japanese-language albums
2002 albums
Deen (band) albums